Clary Hood Smith (September 20, 1928 – January 10, 2019) was an American politician in the state of South Carolina. He served in the South Carolina House of Representatives from 1963 to 1966, representing Spartanburg County, South Carolina. He was a fuel oil dealer.

References

1928 births
2019 deaths
Politicians from Spartanburg, South Carolina
Businesspeople from South Carolina
Members of the South Carolina House of Representatives
20th-century American businesspeople